was a Japanese actress, also credited as Ura Mita.

Career

In 1912, she and her actor husband were co-founders of the Modern Theatre Society (Kindaigeki Kyokai) in Tokyo, formed to bring new Western works to Japanese audiences. In 1914, Yamakawa was considered one of "the foremost interpreters of roles in Western translations" among Japanese actresses. Among her notable roles were Henrik Ibsen's Hedda Gabler, Gretchen in Goethe's Faust, and Lady Macbeth, in which role she gave "a most remarkably untraditional sleep-walking scene". The Modern Theatre Society ended in 1919, when the founders moved to the United States.

She had small roles in two films during her time in America: The Devil Dancer (1927, now lost; a silent film directed by Fred Niblo) and Wu Li Chang (1930, a Spanish-language production).

Personal life
Uraji Yamakawa was married to fellow Japanese actor Sōjin Kamiyama; they lived in California while Sōjin was appearing in American films. After they separated, Yamakawa took bit parts, sold makeup, and cared for her adult son, Edward, who had tuberculosis. During this period, she was friends with novelist Toshiko Tamura. However, during World War II she was relocated along with other Japanese-Americans, while her son was not sent together because of his illness (his subsequent fate is unknown). Yamakawa died in 1947, aged 62 years.

References

External links
 

1885 births
1947 deaths
Japanese actresses